The Man Who Doesn't Return is a 1991 Soviet drama film directed by Sergey Snezhkin. This fictional film's plot features a planned coup against the Soviet government. By coincidence, this made the film very topical because while it filmed beforehand, it was released and aired on television on August 20 1991 during a real coup in the Soviet Union, one that lead to the Soviet Union's demise later that year.

Plot 
A television reporter finds out about the upcoming coup and begins an investigation.

Cast 
 Yury Kuznetsov as Andrey Korneyev
 Nikolai Yeremenko Sr. as Viktor Andreyevich
 Yuriy Oskin as Kolya
 Viktor Aristov as Dissident
 Era Ziganshina as Galina Mikhaylovna Grigoryeva (Melentyeva)
 Iosif Raikhelgauz as Andrey Korneyev's Friend
 Elena Anisimova
 Aleksandr Belyavskiy	
 Natalya Dmitriyeva
 Igor Efimov

References

External links 
 

1991 films
1990s Russian-language films
Soviet drama films
1991 drama films